Murad Mohammed Sabah (born 1 April 1997) is an Iraqi professional footballer who plays as a forward for Al-Zawraa in the Iraqi Premier League and the Iraqi national team.

Club career

Al-Kahrabaa
Mohammed signed for Iraqi Premier League side Al-Kahrabaa in 2017, helping them to fifth place in his debut season, their best ever finish in their history. The following season, Murad helped the club to their first ever Iraq FA Cup final, beating Al-Talaba 3-0 in the semi-final before losing to Al-Zawraa 1-0 in the final.

Al-Shorta
In June 2020, Mohammed signed for Iraqi Premier League defending champions Al-Shorta. Murad scored his first goals for his new club in November 2020 in the Iraq FA Cup against Al-Khalis, scoring two goals in a 5-0 victory.

International career

Iraq U-20
Mohammed was first called up by his country at Under-20 level.

Iraq U-23
Murad was part of the Iraq U-23 side that qualified for the 2020 AFC U-23 Championship in Australia. Murad scored 3 goals in 3 appearances in the qualifiers and started all 3 matches in the tournament as Iraq were knocked out at the group stage.

Iraq
On 27 January 2021, Murad Mohammed made his first international cap with Iraq against Kuwait in a friendly.

References

External links 
 

1997 births
Living people
Iraqi footballers
Iraq international footballers
Al-Shorta SC players
Association football forwards